The WWE United States Championship is a professional wrestling championship promoted by the American promotion WWE, currently defended on the Raw brand division. It is one of two secondary championships for WWE's main roster, along with the WWE Intercontinental Championship on SmackDown. The current champion is Austin Theory, who is in his second reign.

The championship was established on January 1, 1975, as the version of the NWA United States Heavyweight Championship that was defended in Jim Crockett Promotions, and later assumed by World Championship Wrestling (WCW), which eventually seceded from the National Wrestling Alliance (NWA). Harley Race was the inaugural champion. After WCW was purchased by the then-World Wrestling Federation (WWF) in 2001, the then-WCW United States Championship was defended in the WWF until it was unified with the Intercontinental Championship at that year's Survivor Series. After the 2002 brand extension and the promotion being renamed WWE, the championship was reactivated as the WWE United States Championship in July 2003 as a secondary title of the SmackDown brand. The United States Championship has switched between brands over the years, usually as a result of the WWE Draft; the 2019 Superstar Shake-up moved the title to Raw.

Of WWE's currently active championships, the United States Championship is the only one that did not originate in the promotion. It is the second-oldest active title in the company, behind the WWE Championship (1963), but the third longest-tenured championship, behind the WWE and Intercontinental Championships (1979), as WWE has only owned the United States Championship since 2001.

History 

The United States Championship began as a regional championship called the NWA United States Heavyweight Championship, one of several versions of the title allowed in different territories under the National Wrestling Alliance (NWA) bylaws. It was created by and defended in Mid-Atlantic Championship Wrestling (MACW) run by Jim Crockett Jr. Introduced on January 1, 1975, Harley Race became the inaugural champion. The title quickly replaced the NWA Mid-Atlantic Heavyweight Championship as the top singles title in the promotion. While the NWA recognized only one World Heavyweight Champion, there was no single undisputed United States Champion as a number of NWA regional promotions recognized their own version of the title and champion. That changed, however, in January 1981; San Francisco-based NWA territory Big Time Wrestling, which was the last remaining promotion outside the Mid-Atlantic territory that recognized its own United States Champion, ceased operations around that time, leaving the Mid-Atlantic version as the only remaining United States Championship.

The title remained the primary championship within the Mid-Atlantic territory until 1986 when Crockett gained control of the NWA World Heavyweight Championship. The United States title then became the secondary championship of the promotion. After Ted Turner bought the company and renamed it World Championship Wrestling (WCW) in November 1988, the title continued to be used and recognized as secondary to the World Championship. WCW began to pull itself away from the NWA, demonstrated by the company changing the name of the title to the WCW United States Heavyweight Championship in January 1991.

On the April 6, 1991, episode of World Championship Wrestling, Nikita Koloff destroyed the classic 1980s United States Heavyweight Championship belt during a post-match brawl with Lex Luger, who was in his fourth reign as champion. Koloff, who claimed to be the true champion, knocked Luger unconscious by striking him with the title belt and then repeatedly smashed the championship belt into a ringpost. Luger would appear without a physical championship belt, and later became the first to wear a newly designed belt, which was used up through WCW's closing in March 2001, after being purchased by rival promotion, the then-World Wrestling Federation (WWF). In 2000, Lance Storm won the title and unofficially renamed it as the Canadian Heavyweight Championship, complete with large Canadian flag stickers that covered the belt's faceplates.

When WWF purchased WCW, they used the United States title during the WWF's Invasion storyline. The title was deactivated after being unified with the then-WWF Intercontinental Championship at that year's Survivor Series, when United States Champion Edge defeated Intercontinental Champion Test, becoming the new Intercontinental Champion. In July 2003, a year after the first brand extension went into effect in the promotion renamed World Wrestling Entertainment (WWE), the title was reactivated as the WWE United States Championship by then-SmackDown! General Manager Stephanie McMahon and with a completely new belt design. It was commissioned to be a secondary championship for the SmackDown! brand, making the championship the only one from WCW to be reactivated as a WWE title (although the WCW Cruiserweight Championship had also become a WWE title, it was not deactivated and reactivated; it replaced the WWF Light Heavyweight Championship during the Invasion storyline). Eddie Guerrero became the first champion after its reactivation by winning a tournament at that year's Vengeance, defeating Chris Benoit in the final match. This was done shortly after the Intercontinental Championship was recommissioned by the Raw brand, making the title its equal counterpart. The first brand extension ended on August 29, 2011, allowing the United States Championship, as well as all other titles, to be defended on both Raw and SmackDown. In August 2014, the United States Championship belt, along with all other pre-existing championship belts in WWE at the time, received a minor update, replacing the long-standing scratch logo with WWE's current logo that was originally used for the WWE Network. Aside from the logo update, the U.S. title maintained the same design from 2003 until a completely new design was unveiled on the July 6, 2020 episode of Raw.

In 2015, WWE introduced an updated version of its Grand Slam Championship, and the United States Championship became officially recognized as a component of the re-established honor. In August at that year's SummerSlam, United States Champion John Cena faced WWE World Heavyweight Champion Seth Rollins in a Winner Takes All match, which Rollins ultimately won to become the first wrestler to hold the WWE World Heavyweight Championship and United States Championship simultaneously. Rollins held both titles until Cena defeated Rollins in his rematch for the title at Night of Champions the following month.

In July 2016, WWE reintroduced the brand extension; during the draft, United States Champion Rusev was drafted to the Raw brand. Days later, he successfully defended the title against SmackDown draftee Zack Ryder at Battleground, keeping the title exclusive to Raw. On April 11, 2017, United States Champion Kevin Owens, along with the title, moved to SmackDown as a result of that year's Superstar Shake-up. Owens was already scheduled to defend the title against Chris Jericho at the Raw-exclusive pay-per-view Payback on April 30. Then-SmackDown General Manager Daniel Bryan declared that regardless of who won at Payback, the United States Championship would remain on SmackDown; Jericho defeated Owens for the title at Payback and he transferred to SmackDown. During the 2018 Superstar Shake-up, the title briefly returned to Raw when champion Jinder Mahal was drafted to the brand. However, it was immediately returned to SmackDown after Jeff Hardy defeated Mahal for the title and was drafted to SmackDown the next night. The championship definitively returned to Raw in 2019 when reigning champion Samoa Joe was drafted to the brand during that year's Superstar Shake-up.

On the July 6, 2020 episode of Raw, after 17 years since the title's reactivation, MVP introduced a completely new belt design for the United States Championship. The belt now features only three plates. The center plate is an upside down heptagon. The top portion of the center plate features the WWE logo flanked by white stars on a gold background. Below this, "UNITED STATES" is written in red, with "CHAMPION" prominently written below that in blue; eight stars divide the two. Below the word champion is an eagle with its wings spread out across the plate, with the red and white stripes of the American flag beneath its wings. Coming in line with the majority of WWE's other championship belts, the belt features two side plates with a removable center section that can be customized with the champion's logos; the default side plates consist of the WWE logo over a globe.

Brand designation history 
Following the revival of the United States Championship in 2003, the title was designated to SmackDown. The brand extension was discontinued on August 29, 2011, but it was revived on July 19, 2016. The following list indicates the transitions of the United States Championship between the Raw, SmackDown, and ECW brands.

Tournaments

WWE United States Championship Tournament (2003)
The tournament for the vacant WWE United States Championship was held between June 19 and July 27, 2003 for the SmackDown! brand.

WWE United States Championship Tournament (2017–18)
At Clash of Champions 2017, Dolph Ziggler won the United States Championship by defeating defending champion Baron Corbin and Bobby Roode in a triple threat match. On the following episode of SmackDown Live, after recapping all of his previous accolades, Ziggler said that the WWE Universe did not deserve him and he dropped the title in the ring and left. After unsuccessful attempts at contacting Ziggler, SmackDown General Manager Daniel Bryan declared the title vacant and announced a tournament to crown a new champion. The final was originally scheduled to occur at the 2018 Royal Rumble, but was moved up to the January 23 episode of SmackDown Live. However, on the January 16 episode, after Jinder Mahal and Bobby Roode won their respective semifinals matches, Roode challenged Mahal to have the final that night and Bryan scheduled it for that episode's main event.

Reigns

The inaugural champion was Harley Race. There have been 101 different champions, with Ric Flair having the most reigns at six. The longest-reigning champion is Lex Luger, who held the title for 523 days from May 22, 1989, to October 27, 1990. "Stunning" Steve Austin's second reign was the shortest, lasting approximately five minutes. Dean Ambrose is the longest-reigning champion under the WWE banner at 351 days, lasting from May 19, 2013, to May 5, 2014. Booker T and Seth Rollins are the only two men to have held both the United States Championship and a world championship simultaneously; in Booker T's case, the world title was the WCW World Heavyweight Championship, while Rollins held the WWE World Heavyweight Championship (both Lex Luger and Goldberg were the United States Champion when they won their first world championship, but unlike Booker T and Rollins, they vacated the United States Championship after winning their world championships). Terry Funk is the oldest champion in the title's history, winning the title at the age of 56 on September 22, 2000, while David Flair is the youngest at the age of 20 on July 5, 1999. Between NWA/WCW and WWE, the title has been vacated 21 times.

Austin Theory is the current champion in his second reign. He defeated previous champion Seth "Freakin" Rollins and Bobby Lashley in a triple threat match at Survivor Series WarGames on November 26, 2022 in Boston, Massachusetts.

See also 

 Professional wrestling in the United States
 WWWF United States Tag Team Championship

References 

Notes

External links 
 WCW United States Heavyweight Title Histories
 WCW/WWE United States Title History

1975 establishments in the United States
Jim Crockett Promotions championships
National Wrestling Alliance championships
NWA United States Heavyweight Championships
United States professional wrestling championships
World Championship Wrestling championships
Championships acquired by WWE